Abutilon guineense is a species of flowering plant in the mallow family, Malvaceae. It has a broad distribution in Africa and has been introduced elsewhere. It may comprise more than one species, with others yet undescribed. In China it occurs in Hainan, Sichuan, and Yunnan.

Abutilon guineense was originally described by Heinrich Christian Friedrich Schumacher in 1829 as Sida guineensis. Two varieties are accepted:

References

guineense
Plants described in 1829
Flora of Africa